In Euclidean plane geometry, the van Lamoen circle is a special circle associated with any given triangle .  It contains the circumcenters of the six triangles that are defined inside  by its three medians.

History

The van Lamoen circle is named after the mathematician Floor van Lamoen https://nl.wikipedia.org/wiki/Floor_van_Lamoen who posed it as a problem in 2000. A proof was provided by Kin Y. Li in 2001, and the editors of the Amer. Math. Monthly in 2002.

Properties

The center of the van Lamoen circle is point  in Clark Kimberling's comprehensive list of triangle centers.

A simpler proof of this result was given by Nguyen Minh Ha in 2005.

See also
 Parry circle
 Lester circle

References 

Circles defined for a triangle